Rosaryhill School is a private co-educational primary school in Hong Kong. It relies on government funding from the aided secondary school.

History 
The school was founded by the Dominican Fathers in 1959. 

Since the establishment of Rosaryhill School, the position of Supervisor has been filled by Dominican priests. Fr. He Yousun is the current supervisor of Rosaryhill School.

In April 2019, a teenage boy was injured in a violent attack by a fellow student with a pen at the secondary section. A 16-year-old Form Three student was injured on the left side of his face by a 17-year-old Form Two student during the school's lunch break.

In 2009, four girl students were caught taking ketamine on school premises.

Sections 
The school has three sections, which are: Kindergarten, Primary, and secondary. Historically, it also offered business studies.

Notable alumni

 Hon. Bernard Charnwut Chan - member of the Executive Council of Hong Kong
 Bobo Chan - former Hong Kong singer and model
 Constance Chan Hon-yee - medicine specialist and civil servant
 Leslie Cheung - Cantopop singer and actor, considered as one of the founding fathers of Cantopop
 Kelly Chen - Cantopop singer and actress
 Charlene Choi - actress and singer, best known as a member of the Cantopop girl group Twins, alongside Gillian Chung
 Queenie Chu - 1st Runner Up of Miss Hong Kong 2004; actress of TVB
 Tony Leung Ka Fai - actor, known for his starring in the horror feature Double Vision; won three times Best Actor Award in Hong Kong Film Awards
 Kenix Kwok - actress
 Barbara Yung - actress, popular during the early 1980s

References

External links

RHS website
 School song
RHSOSA (Rosaryhill School Old Student Association)

1959 establishments in Hong Kong
Catholic primary schools in Hong Kong
Catholic secondary schools in Hong Kong
Dominican schools in Hong Kong
Educational institutions established in 1959
Happy Valley, Hong Kong
Mid-Levels
Private primary schools in Hong Kong
Shrines to the Virgin Mary